Gregor Innes Macmillan (born 7 August 1969) is an English former first-class cricketer, later a solicitor and schoolteacher.

Cricket
Macmillan played 53 first-class matches for Oxford University, Gloucestershire and Leicestershire between 1993 and 1998, scoring 2024 runs as a right-handed batsman. He made 3 centuries, with a best of 122. He also took 23 wickets with his occasional off spin. He also played 45 list A one day games. The 'mercurial' Macmillan joined Leicestershire in the middle of the 1995 season after captaining Oxford University and began his County career in fine form. He became only the third Leicestershire player to score a century on their Championship debut after recording 103 in the second innings in a victory against Sussex at Hove. A week later, Macmillan followed his excellent display with a performance of equal pomp in another victory, this time against Surrey at Grace Road, in which he scored 122 – his second century in as many matches for Leicestershire. These performances earned him the 'Player of the Month' award for July in his inaugural month at the club. Macmillan ended the 1995 season with an average of 43.22, bettered only by the great Hansie Cronje. Macmillan went on to win both the 1996 County Championship with Leicestershire and also the 1996 Bain Hogg Trophy in a remarkable season for the club.

After cricket
Macmillan holds a degree in Philosophy and Politics from the University of Southampton and an Advanced Diploma in Social Administration from the University of Oxford. He qualified and practised as a solicitor before taking up teaching. He was an assistant housemaster at St John's School, Leatherhead, then became housemaster of Turner House at Marlborough College in 2012.

References

External links
Cricinfo profile
CricketArchive profile

1969 births
Gloucestershire cricketers
Leicestershire cricketers
Oxford University cricketers
Living people
English cricketers
Alumni of the University of Southampton
Alumni of Keble College, Oxford
English solicitors
Schoolteachers from Surrey
British Universities cricketers